Maysky (masculine), Mayskaya (feminine), or Mayskoye (neuter) may refer to:

People
Ivan Maysky (1884–1975), Soviet diplomat, historian, and politician
Mischa Maisky (b. 1948), Latvian-born Israelian cellist

Places
Maysky District, a district of the Kabardino-Balkar Republic, Russia
Maysky Urban Settlement, several municipal urban settlements in Russia
Maysky (inhabited locality) (Mayskaya, Mayskoye), several inhabited localities in Russia

Other
 Maisky, a pet monkey in Anthony Powell's 1957 novel At Lady Molly's
Mayskoye mine, a gold mine in Chukotka Autonomous Okrug, Russia

See also
Ayano-Maysky District, a district of Khabarovsk Krai, Russia
Ust-Maysky District, a district of the Sakha Republic, Russia
May (disambiguation)